The Four Horsemen of the Apocalypse are four beings described in the New Testament's Book of Revelation.

Four Horsemen of the Apocalypse or Four Horsemen may also refer to:

People
Four Horsemen (Supreme Court), United States Supreme Court's conservative justices during the New Deal era
Four Horsemen of the Apocalypse (blackjack), the four U.S. Army engineers who discovered in the 1950s the first correct Basic Strategy for the casino game of Blackjack
Four Horsemen (NASA), senior scientists and consultants to NASA during the Apollo program: Bob Walker, Jim Arnold, Paul Werner Gast, and Gerry Wasserburg
The Four Horsemen (discussion), a round table discussion by Richard Dawkins, Daniel C. Dennett, Sam Harris, and Christopher Hitchens
Four Horsemen (American football), the nickname of the 1924 Notre Dame Fighting Irish football team backfield
The Four Horsemen (professional wrestling), a professional wrestling stable
The Four Horseman, a contract bridge team founded in 1931 by P. Hal Sims, consisting of Sims, Oswald Jacoby, Willard S. Karn, and David Burnstine

Fiction
The Four Horsemen of the Apocalypse (novel), novel about the First World War by Vicente Blasco Ibáñez (1916) 
The Four Horsemen (poetry), Toronto sound-poetry group formed by Steve McCaffery in 1970
Horsemen of Apocalypse, characters in Marvel's X-Men universe
Four Horsemen (Highlander), four immortals from Highlander: The Series
The Four Horsemen of the Apocalypse, lead characters in the East of West comic series by Jonathan Hickman and Nick Dragotta
Four Knights of the Apocalypse, Japanese manga series by Nakaba Suzuki

Film and television
The Four Horsemen of the Apocalypse (film), a film based on the Blasco Ibáñez novel (1921)
The 4 Horsemen of the Apocalypse (film), remake of the 1921 film (1962)
Four of the Apocalypse, a spaghetti western (1975)
Four Horsemen (film), a documentary film by Ross Ashcroft on the banking system (2012)
Four Horsemen (Highlander), a group of Immortals on the television show Highlander: The Series
The Four Horsemen of the Apocalypse, characters in the 5th season of the TV series Supernatural
The Four Horsemen (professional wrestling), a former wrestling stable in the NWA and WCW wrestling organizations
The Four Horsemen - a fictitious group of 4 magicians in Now You See Me (film) and Now You See Me 2

Music

Bands
The Four Horsemen (band), a hard rock band from Hollywood (1989–1996)
The Four Horsemen (rap group), formed by Canibus, Killah Priest, Ras Kass, and Kurupt in 1996

Songs and albums

"The Four Horsemen (Aphrodite's Child song)", a song on the Aphrodite's Child album 666 (1972)
"Four Horsemen", a song on The Clash album London Calling (1979)
"The Four Horsemen" (Metallica song), on the Metallica album Kill 'Em All (1983)
Horsemen of the Apocalypse (album), Metallica demo
4 Horsemen of the Apocalypse, an album by the Bollock Brothers (1985)
The Four Horsemen (album), by Ultramagnetic MC's (1993)
"4 Horsemen of 2012", a song on the Klaxons EP Xan Valleys (2006) 
"4 Horsemen", a song on the Timbaland album Textbook Timbo (2007)
"Four Horsemen of 2012", a song on the Klaxons album Myths of the Near Future (2007)
"The Four Horsemen", a song on the Judas Priest album Nostradamus (2008)
"The Four Horsemen", a song on the Rotting Christ album Rituals (2016).

Other uses
Four Horsemen Studios, a collectible figure design studio and manufacturer
The Four Horsemen of the Apocalypse (video game), a cancelled video game (2002)
The Four Horsemen of the Apocalypse, a woodcut by Albrecht Dürer in his series Apocalypse (1498)
Four Horsemen of the Apocalypse (painting), a painting by Russian artist Viktor Vasnetsov

See also
Horseman (disambiguation)
The Fourth Horseman (disambiguation)
Four Horsemen of the Infocalypse, term for internet criminals, or the imagery of internet criminals